Langeloop is a village in Ehlanzeni District Municipality in the Mpumalanga province of South Africa.

References

Populated places in the Nkomazi Local Municipality